Below are the squads for the men's football tournament at the 2010 Asian Games, played in Guangzhou, China.

Group A

China
Coach: Sun Wei

Japan
Coach: Takashi Sekizuka

Kyrgyzstan
Coach: Murat Jumakeyev

Malaysia
Coach: K. Rajagopal

Group B

Bahrain
Coach: Mohamed Al-Shamlan

Iran
Coach: Gholam Hossein Peyrovani

Turkmenistan
Coach: Kamil Mingazow

Vietnam
Coach: Phan Thanh Hùng

Group C

Jordan
Coach:  Alaa Nabil

North Korea
Coach: Jo Dong-soeb

Palestine
Coach:  Mokhtar Tlili

South Korea
Coach: Hong Myung-bo

Group D

Athletes from Kuwait
Coach: Maher Al-Shammari

India
Coach: Sukhwinder Singh

Qatar
Coach:  Co Adriaanse

Singapore
Coach: V. Sundramoorthy

Group E

Bangladesh
Coach:  Robert Rubčić

Hong Kong
Coach: Tsang Wai Chung

United Arab Emirates
Coach: Mahdi Ali

Uzbekistan
Coach: Akhmad Ubaydullaev

Group F

Maldives
Coach: Mauroof Ahmed

Oman
Coach: Ibrahim Sumar Al-Balushi

Pakistan
Coach: Akhtar Mohiuddin

Thailand
Coach:  Bryan Robson

References

Qatar squad
Thailand squad

External links
2010 Asian Games Official Website

Squads
2010